A composite aircraft is made up of multiple component craft. It takes off and flies initially as a single aircraft, with the components able to separate in flight and continue as independent aircraft. Typically the larger aircraft acts as a carrier aircraft or mother ship, with the smaller sometimes called a parasite or jockey craft.

The first composite aircraft flew in 1916, during World War I, when the British launched a Bristol Scout from a Felixstowe Porte Baby flying boat. Between the World Wars, American experiments with airship/biplane composites led to the construction of two airborne aircraft carriers, while the British Short Mayo seaplane composite demonstrated successful transatlantic mail delivery. During the Second World War some composites saw operational use including the Mistel ("mistletoe"), the larger unmanned component of a composite aircraft configuration developed in Germany during the later stages of World War II, in effect a two-part manned flying bomb. Experiments continued into the jet age, with large aircraft carrying fully capable parasite fighters or reconnaissance drones, though none entered service.

Design principles
A composite configuration is usually adopted to provide improved performance or operational flexibility for one of the components, compared to a single craft flying alone. Composite designs can take a number of different forms:

In the original composite arrangement, the smaller component carries out the operational mission and is mounted on a larger carrier aircraft or "mother ship". Thus it need not be compromised by the requirements for takeoff, climb and initial cruise, but may be optimised for the later stages of the mission.

In another form the larger carrier aircraft conducts the main operational mission, with small parasite aircraft carried to support it or extend its mission if required.

A third variant comprises a small piloted jockey component coupled with a larger unpiloted component. This arrangement is typically used as an attack aircraft in which the larger component is loaded with explosives and impacts the target.

The slip-wing composite comprises a lightweight upper lifting component, the slip wing, which assists the lower operational component during initial takeoff and climb: in the true slip-wing, the two wings act together as a biplane. The slip wing component may or may not be powered and/or manned.

Airship-aeroplane composites

[[Image:XF9C 1 aircraft hooking onto USS Akron, May 1932.jpg|thumb|F9C Sparrowhawk on the Akron'''s trapeze]]

During and after World War I, a number of efforts were made to develop airship-plane composites, in which one or more aeroplanes were carried by an airship.

United Kingdom
The first British effort, undertaken in 1916 with a non-rigid SS class airship, was aimed at the anti-Zeppelin role. The airship was to provide fast climb to altitude, while a B.E.2c aeroplane would provide the speed and manoeuvrability to attack the Zeppelin. It ended in disaster when the forward attachment point released prematurely and the aeroplane tipped nose-down. Both crew were killed in the ensuing disaster. By 1918 larger rigid airships were available and a Sopwith Camel was successfully released by HMA 23 in July 1918, but the armistice halted work. The idea was briefly revived in 1925 when the airship R33 was used to launch and then recapture a DH 53 Hummingbird light monoplane aircraft and, in 1926, two Gloster Grebe biplane fighters.

Germany
The first parasite fighter was a  German Albatros D.III which flew from Zeppelin L 35 (LZ 80) on January 26, 1918. The LZ 129 Hindenburg later conducted trials using parasite aircraft in the days before it crashed at Lakehurst, but the trial proved unsuccessful as the plane hit the hull trapeze.

United States
In 1923 the TC-3 and TC-7 non-rigid airships launched and recovered a Sperry Messenger biplane.

Then in 1930, the US Navy fitted the USS Los Angeles with a trapeze designed to release and recover a small parasite aircraft. Successful trials with a glider and a biplane led to the construction of the Akron and Macon airships as airborne aircraft carriers.

List of airship-aeroplane composites

Composite aeroplanes

The first composite aeroplanes

In parallel with early airship activity, efforts also went into carrying a fighter plane aloft on top of a second aeroplane.

In the UK, the Felixstowe Porte Baby/Bristol Scout composite flew in May 1916. The idea was to intercept German Zeppelin airships far out to sea, beyond the normal range of a land or shore based craft. The successful first flight was not followed up, due to the ungainliness of the composite in takeoff and its vulnerability in flight. From 1921, a series of types were adapted as carriers for gliders used as aerial targets.

The Short Mayo Composite mailplane comprised the S.21 Maia carrier flying boat and S.20 Mercury parasite seaplane. It made successful transatlantic flights in trials during 1938, before operations were cut short by the outbreak of war.

World War II
Several countries experimented with composite designs during the second world war, and a few of these were used on operational missions.

In the USSR, the Tupolev Vakhmistrov Zveno project developed a series of composite types. The SPB variant used the Tupolev TB-3 as the mother ship and in 1941 Polikarpov I-16 dive-bombers flying from it became the first parasite fighters to see successfully operate in combat.

In the UK, Pemberton-Billing proposed "slip-wing" composite bomber and fighter types, early in the war. Hawker's also worked on a Liberator/Hurricane composite.

In America in 1943, O.A. Buettner patented a composite design in which the secondary fighter components' wings fitted into depressions in the carrier's upper wing.

A number of composite proposals were considered by German designers during World War II. Of these, the Junkers Ju 88 Mistel project reached operational status, mounting either a manned Messerschmitt Bf 109 or Focke-Wulf Fw 190 fighter above an unmanned shaped charge-warheaded Junkers Ju 88 and flying a number of combat missions. The führungsmaschine (pathfinder) project used a similar Ju 88/Fw 190 combination where the Ju 88 was also manned and the Fw 190 was carried as a protective escort fighter. The Dornier Do 217/Messerschmitt Me 328 escort fighter project was unsuccessful due to engine problems. Other studies included the  Daimler-Benz Project C.

Postwar
Experiments with parasite aircraft continued into the jet age, especially in America and, immediately post-war, in France as well for their own advanced jet and rocket-powered experimental designs - first achieved with the pair of postwar-completed Heinkel He 274 four-engined high altitude bomber prototypes, both built in France.

In America the FIghter CONveyer (FICON) trapeze system was developed for carrying, launching and recovering parasite fighters.
Examples with and without the FICON system included:
 B-36/XF-85 Goblin, an attempt to equip bombers with their own escort fighters (1948)
 Convair B-36/F-84, another, more successful, escort fighter attempt (1952)
 Lockheed DC-130/Q-2C Firebee, drone launched and controlled from C-130 "mother"
 Lockheed D-21/M-21, for high-speed reconnaissance, based upon the SR-71 Blackbird (1963)

Elsewhere, during the 1950s in the UK Short Brothers studied proposals for a composite VTOL strike fighter but the design did not progress.

In modern times the term "composite aircraft" tends to refer to types constructed from composite materials. The White Knight/Space Ship One spaceplane is a composite aircraft in both senses.

List of composite aeroplanes

See also
 Parasite aircraft

References

Notes

Bibliography
 Harper, H.C.J.; Composite history, Flight, November 11, 1937. 
 Winchester, J. (Ed.); Concept aircraft'', Grange, 2005

 
Aircraft configurations
Vehicles introduced in 1916